The Galician or Galician Mountain Horse, is a breed of small horse from Galicia, in north-western Spain. It is genetically very close to the Garrano breed of northern Portugal. It was in the past used as a war-horse and in agriculture; it is now raised for shows and riding. They are very useful for ranchwork. The horses are bay or black.

History

The most commonly accepted theory of the origin of the Gallego is that it, like other small breeds of the northern part of the Iberian peninsula, descends from small dark-coloured horses introduced by Celtic immigrants in the sixth century BC.

In the Middle Ages these horses were rented or swapped for other horses at the border between Galicia and Castile, since the Galician was more sturdy and suitable for the rugged landscape of the country.

In the 1980s and 90s there was concern that the introduction of stallions of other breeds, with better meat-producing qualities, was placing at risk the original stock of Galician horses. The Xunta de Galicia published a conservation plan for the breed in 1993.

The Gallego is regulated and protected by the Galician government, in an attempt to increase the numbers of the feral stock.

Distribution and management

It is distributed through much of Galicia. It is present in the concellos of A Estrada, Cambados, Covelo, Poio, Pontevedra and Santa María de Oia in the province of Pontevedra; of Abegondo, Arzúa, Cambre, Cariño, Cerceda, Curtis, Ferrol, Irixoa, Lousame, Noia, Ortigueira and Porto do Son in the province of A Coruña; of Guitiriz, Muras, Ourol, Mondoñedo, Riotorto, Vilalba and Viveiro in the province of Lugo; and of Castro Caldelas, Coles and Lobios in the province of Ourense. A small number have been exported to Germany. In 2013 the total population was reported as 1623.

Almost all Gallego horses are managed extensively, in semi-feral conditions on the mountains of Galicia.

References

Horse breeds
Horse breeds originating in Spain